Idioglossa is a genus of moths of the family Batrachedridae.

Taxonomy
The genus was created by Thomas de Grey, 6th Baron Walsingham in 1881 to house the new species Idioglossa bigemma. Because Lord Walsingham had created a monotypic genus at the time, the species I. bigemma is considered the type species by monotypy. The next year, in 1882, Lord Walsingham proposed to rename the taxon as Idiostoma, because he considered the name inappropriate, but by the rules of taxonomy this is considered unnecessary.

The Australian entomologist Ian Francis Bell Common classified it in the subfamily Stathmopodinae of the family Oecophoridae in 1996. It was reclassified in the subfamily Batrachedrinae of the Batrachedridae by Kazuhiro Sugisima in 2000.

Species
The genus contains the following species:
Idioglossa argodora Meyrick, 1913 - southern India
Idioglossa bigemma Walsingham, 1881
Idioglossa bigemma ssp. bigemma - Southern Africa
Idioglossa bigemma ssp. mascarena Bippus, 2016 - Réunion
Idioglossa metallochrysa A.J. Turner, 1917 - northern Queensland
Idioglossa miraculosa (Frey & Boll, 1878) - Texas
Idioglossa polliacola Sugisima, 2000 - Japan
Idioglossa thailandica Sugisima, 2004 - Thailand
Idioglossa triacma Meyrick, 1913 - Assam, Khasi Hills
Idioglossa triumphalis Meyrick, 1918 - Bela Vista, Angola?

Ecology
Of the species of which a host plant is known, the caterpillars feed on plants of the families Costaceae, Gramineae or Commelinaceae.

References

www.jpmoth.org

Batrachedridae